Charles Mason, known as Charlie Mason, (13 April 1863 – 3 February 1941) was an English professional footballer, who played for Wolverhampton Wanderers.

Robust full–back Charlie Mason was born in Wolverhampton on 13 April 1863. Founder member  of  the club after leaving St. Luke's School in 1877, he went on to enjoy 15 splendid years with Wolverhampton Wanderers, making almost 300 appearances, including over 100 in the League and FA Cup competitions before announcing his retirement during the Summer of 1892.

Charlie Mason, playing as a full–back,  made his League debut on 8 September 1888, at Dudley Road, the then home of  Wolverhampton Wanderers. The visitors were Aston Villa and the match ended as a 1–1 draw. Mason appeared in 20 of the 22 League matches played by Wolverhampton Wanderers during the 1888–89 season. Playing as a full–back (20 appearances) he was part of a defence-line that kept three clean–sheets and kept the opposition to one–League–goal–in–a–match on eight separate occasions. He also played in the 1889 FA Cup Final as Wolverhampton Wanderers lost to Preston North End 3–0.

He became the first player in the club's history to receive a call-up to the England team in 1887, making his debut in a 7-0 thumping of Ireland on 5 February 1887. He won 3 caps in total, all in Home International fixtures spread over three years.

He died on 3 February 1941, in Wolverhampton aged 77.

References

External links 
 
 Profile on www.englandfc.com

1863 births
1941 deaths
Footballers from Wolverhampton
English footballers
England international footballers
Wolverhampton Wanderers F.C. players
English Football League players
Association football fullbacks
FA Cup Final players